The Hundred of Cavenagh is a Hundred of Palmerston County, Northern Territory Australia.

The Hundred  is located at Latitude -12°49'S and Longitude 130°59'E.

This Hundred was gazzeted on 14/09/1871 and is named after Wentworth Cavenagh, Mayor of Adelaide in 1874 and later became Premier of South Australia.

References

C